Mayfield is an English surname. Notable people with the surname include:

Baker Mayfield (born 1995), American football player
Brandon Mayfield (born 1966), attorney erroneously linked to the 2004 Madrid train bombings
Cleo Mayfield (1898–1954), American actress and singer
Curtis Mayfield (1942–1999), American soul, R&B, and funk singer
Debbie Mayfield (born 1956), American politician
Edwin Mayfield (1870–1961), British international rugby union player
Harold F. Mayfield (1911–2007), American business executive and ornithologist
Irvin Mayfield (born 1977), American jazz musician, New Orleans
Jack Mayfield (born 1990), American baseball player
Jalen Mayfield (born 2000), American football player
Jeremy Mayfield (born 1969), American auto racer
Jessica Lea Mayfield (born 1989), American singer-songwriter
Julian Mayfield (1928–1984), American actor, director, writer, lecturer and civil rights activist
Maryhelen Mayfield (born 1946), American ballet dancer and arts administrator
Matthew Mayfield (born 1983), American singer-songwriter
Max Mayfield (born 1948), American meteorologist
Percy Mayfield (born 1920), American songwriter and singer
Ross Mayfield, co-founder of Socialtext Incorporated
Scott Mayfield (born 1992), American ice hockey player for the New York Islanders
Scottie Mayfield (born 1950/1951), president of Mayfield Dairy

English toponymic surnames